Time (stylized as TIME) is the sixth Japanese studio album (twelfth overall) by South Korean pop duo Tohoshinki, released by Avex Trax on March 6, 2013. The record was released in four physical versions, each with a theme cover – Version A (Past), a CD+DVD version with music videos; Version B (Present), another CD+DVD version with off-shot movies and live performances; Version C (Future), a CD only version with two bonus tracks; and Version D, a Bigeast fan club limited edition. Musically, Time is primarily an electropop album, with dubstep, electronic dance music, and R&B influences.

Time was Tohoshinki's fastest-selling studio album, selling over 160,000 copies on the first day and over 240,000 copies within the first week of release. The album was also Tohoshinki's third consecutive album to debut at the top of the Oricon Albums Chart and the Billboard Japan Top Albums.

The album spawned four hit singles, all of which peaked within the Top 2 on the Oricon Weekly Charts and sold over 150,000 copies each.

Background
It was first announced that Tohoshinki would be releasing their sixth Japanese album on January 16, 2013 through their official Japanese site. The album's title was revealed to be Time and that its release date was March 6, 2013. It was also stated that the album would come in four versions: CD version, 2 CD+DVD versions, and a special BigEast version.

Commercial performance
The album was commercial success selling 160,719 copies during the first day of release, thus becoming their fastest-selling Japanese studio album and second-fastest selling Japanese release to date. It sold a further 35,930 copies on the second day, bringing total sales over the first 48 hours to 196,649 copies. It sold a further 13,781 copies on the third day of sale, bringing the three-day sales total to 210,430 copies. Displaying their immense popularity in Japan, this album also marked TVXQ's 2nd grab for the first place on the Oricon Monthly Chart with over 277,000 copies sold, beating out Kiss My FT2, and others. Until now, Time has sold over 281,260 copies. As of June 21, 2013, Time is the fourth biggest-selling album of the year in Japan with total sales of 292,632 copies according to Oricon.

Track listing

Notes
Version D is only available on the Bigeast Official Shop, which requires Bigeast membership.

Charts and certifications

Japanese charts

Sales and certifications

Release history

See also
TVXQ albums discography
List of Oricon number-one albums of 2013

References

External links
 Official Time website
  of Tohoshinki
 Official DWB Music LTD

2013 albums
TVXQ albums
Avex Group albums
Japanese-language albums